Lord State Forest, also known as Albert C. Lord State Forest, covers  in Cavendish, Vermont in Windsor County. The forest is managed by the Vermont Department of Forests, Parks, and Recreation. 

Activities in the forest include hunting and snowshoeing.

References

External links
Official website

Vermont state forests
Protected areas of Windsor County, Vermont
Cavendish, Vermont